A laboratory rat is a rat of the species Rattus norvegicus which is bred and kept for scientific research.

Labrat, lab rat,  or lab rats may also refer to:

People and characters
 Dunash ben Labrat (920–990), medieval Jewish commentator, poet, and grammarian
 Paul "Lab Rat" Squirfenherder, a fictional character from the animated TV series Grossology
 The Lab Rats, a player option in the boardgame Gammarauders
 Lab Rat, a recurring villain in SuperKitties

Television
 "Lab Rats", a seventh-season episode of the TV series CSI: Crime Scene Investigation
 Lab Rats (British TV series), a BBC 2 sitcom that began airing in 2008
 Lab Rats (American TV series), a Disney XD sitcom that began airing in 2012
 Lab Rats: Elite Force, a 2016 Disney XD sitcom spinoff of the American TV series
 Lab Rats Challenge, an Australian game show

Other
 Portal 2: Lab Rat, a digital comic published in 2011 to promote the video game Portal 2
 Lab Rats (film), a 2009 short film

See also

 
 
 
 
 Laboratory (disambiguation)
 Lab (disambiguation)
 Rat (disambiguation)
 RAT test (disambiguation)